Oliver Prescott (27 April 1731, in Groton, Massachusetts – 17 November 1804, in Groton) was a colonial-era physician, soldier, and judge.

Biography
He graduated from Harvard in 1750, and was distinguished at college for his literary attainments and correct deportment. After which he was apprenticed to Ebenezer Robie of Sudbury, who had been educated in Europe, and a disciple of the renowned Boerhaave, and was an eminent physician. Dr. Oliver's distinguished professional acquirements; his prompt and unremitted attention to the sick; his tender and pleasant demeanor while treating them in their distress; his moderate charges and forbearance to the poor, together with the general success which attended his practice, operated to render him for nearly half a century, one of the most popular while he was one of the most eminent and useful physicians in the Commonwealth.  He was one of the original members of the Mass. Medical Society at its incorporation in 1781, and an honorary member of sundry medical societies.   He was president of the Middlesex Medical Society during the period of his existence. and then practiced medicine in Groton. He returned to Harvard to get an M.A. in 1753. 
 Dr. Prescott took an early and decided part in the American Revolution by entering warmly into those measures which were necessary to vindicate our national rights, and by assisting cheerfully and largely in their defense.  He received many important appointments.  In the militia, he was appointed by the King a major, then lieutenant colonel and colonel.  In 1776 he was appointed a brigadier general for Middle-sex county by the executive council of Mass Bay: he also was in the same year chosen as a member of the board of war.  In 1777 he was elected a member of the Supreme Executive Council, and in 1778 he was appointed the third major general of the militia throughout the Commonwealth.  He was elected town clerk of Groton from 1765 to 1777, inclusive (13 years).  In 1779, he, Dr. Oliver, was appointed to the office of judge of probate, &c., for the county of Middlesex, which he retained until his death.
In 1781 he was appointed second major general of the militia but soon tendered his resignation by reason of other important duties.  In 1781 Dr. Prescott received from the government a commission to "cause to be arrested and committed to jail, any person whom he should deem the safety of the Commonwealth required to be retained of his personal liberty, or whose enlargement within the Commonwealth is dangerous thereto".  He with his brother James and Jonathan and Amos Lawrence, and eleven others, were appointed to a committee to see that the resolves of the continental congress relative to the "Test Oath", so-called, "be faithfully carried into effect".
Dr. P. has incorporated a Fellow of the American Academy of Arts and Sciences in 1780.  Also, one of the trustees of the Groton Academy, and the first president of the board.  He was in stature full six feet in height, somewhat corpulent, and possessed and ever practiced a peculiar suavity and politeness of manners, and a gentlemanly deportment, which strongly endeared him to the people, always commanding esteem and respect.
He and Lydia Baldwin were wed in 1756. Three of their seven children died in an epidemic of 1765/6.

From 1779 until his death, he was a judge of probate for Middlesex County. In 1780 he became one of the original fellows of the American Academy of Arts and Sciences, and he was a trustee, patron, and benefactor of Groton Academy.

Son
His son, also named Oliver (4 April 1762, Groton – 26 September 1827, Newburyport, Massachusetts), graduated at Harvard in 1783. He prepared for college at Dummer Academy, Byfield Parish, Newbury, Mass.; entered Harvard Coll. In 1779; grad. In 1783; studied medicine with his father, but completed his professional education with Dr. James Lloyd, a celebrated physician of Boston. He has admitted a licentiate by the censors of the Mass. Medical Society in June 1786.  He was appointed surgeon to the regiment under Col. Henry Woods, which, together with other regiments was under command of Gen Lincoln.  These troops were collected and organized for the purpose of suppressing the Shays' Rebellion.  He was afterward made surgeon of the 6th Regiment of the 3rd Division of the militia, which he held until he resigned in 1800.  In 1800 he was elected a member of the Massachusetts Medical Society and was afterward one of its counselors.  He delivered the Annual Discourse before the Society in 1813, and in 1814 received the honorary degree of Doctor of Medicine from Harvard College.  In 1825 he was elected a member of the Corporation of the Massachusetts General Hospital and was elected Vice President of the Medical Society in 1827.  Dr. Prescott had a very extensive practice in his native town of Groton and the towns adjacent.
  
Dr. Prescott was repeatedly, and for many years, called by the citizens of Groton to participate in the management of their municipal affairs, being chosen town clerk, and selectman, (of which he was chairman from 1804 to 1811) repeatedly, 1809–1810, and on, chosen a representative to the General Court. He was one of the original founders of Groton Academy, was a trustee and treasurer of the Institution, and manifested a laudable zeal for the promotion of education and science.  Leaving a large practice in Groton, he removed with his family from Groton to Newburyport, in February 1811, hoping to receive benefits from a residence near the sea, together with a greater regularity of life enjoyed by physicians in compact settlements.  Here his practice soon became extensive and continued so until his death on 26 September 1827 after a short illness of typhus fever, in his 66th year.

 He contributed articles to the New England Journal of Medicine and Surgery, but is best known for a discourse before the Massachusetts Medical Society in 1813, entitled a "Dissertation on the Natural History and Medicinal Effects of Secale Cornutum, or Ergot," which was republished in London, and translated into French and German.

Notes

References

The Prescott memorial, or, A genealogical memoir of the Prescott families in America by Prescott, William, 1788–1875. Published 1870

External links
 

1731 births
1804 deaths
People from Groton, Massachusetts
People of colonial Massachusetts
Harvard University alumni
Fellows of the American Academy of Arts and Sciences
18th-century American physicians
American judges
Physicians from Massachusetts

So Far it is unknown that whether or not he was a loyalist or a patriot.